Creighton C. Hart (February 22, 1906 – March 1, 1993), of Missouri, was a stamp collector and a writer of philatelic articles on specific niches of United States postage stamp collecting.

Collecting interests
Unlike some stamp collectors who collect stamps of many countries, Hart restricted his collecting to narrow views of American philately. He was a specialist in the postage stamps of the United States 1847 issue and postal history related to that issue.  He also specialized in collecting covers containing the free franks of American presidents and their widows. Hart's specialized collections were displayed at various philatelic shows and won many awards.

Philatelic literature
Along with Susan Marshall McDonald, Hart co-authored the “Directory of 10¢ 1847 Covers” which was published in 1970, and expanded by Hart afterwards.

For many years, Hart was an editor at The Chronicle of U.S. Classic Postal Issues, where he was responsible for editing the 1847-1851 section.

Honors and awards
Hart received the Luff Award for Distinguished Philatelic Research in 1970, and was named to the American Philatelic Society Hall of Fame in 1994.

See also
 Philately
 Philatelic literature

References
 Creighton C. Hart

1906 births
1993 deaths
Philatelic literature
American philatelists
People from Missouri
American Philatelic Society